Evelyn G. Chesky (born August 20, 1933, in Chicopee, Massachusetts) is an American politician who represented the 5th Hampden District in the Massachusetts House of Representatives from 1993 to 2001. Prior to becoming a State Representative she was a member of the Holyoke Board of Aldermen.

References

1933 births
Politicians from Holyoke, Massachusetts
Living people
Democratic Party members of the Massachusetts House of Representatives
Women state legislators in Massachusetts
People from Chicopee, Massachusetts
20th-century American politicians
20th-century American women politicians
21st-century American women